Çevrecik can refer to:

 Çevrecik, Arıcak
 Çevrecik, Kozluk
 Çevrecik, Yapraklı